The Women competition at the IBSF World Championships 2021 was held on 11 and 12 February 2021.

Results
The first two runs were started on 11 February at 09:04 and the last two runs on 12 February at 09:04.

References

Women